{{Automatic taxobox
| image = Tympanoctomys barrerae.jpg
| image_caption = Plains viscacha rat, Tympanoctomys barrerae
| taxon = Tympanoctomys
| authority = Yepes, 1942
| type_species_authority = B. Lawrence, 1941
| type_species = Octomys barrerae
| subdivision_ranks = Species
| subdivision = 
 T. barrerae (B. Lawrence, 1941)
 T. kirchnerorum Teta et al., 2014
 T. loschalchalerosorum Mares, Braun, Barquez & Diaz, 2000
 †T. cordubensis}}Tympanoctomys is a genus of rodent in the family Octodontidae. There are three extant species in the genus: T. barrerae, T. kirchnerorum and T. loschalchalerosorum. T. loschalchalerosorum was formerly considered to be monotypic within the genus Salinoctomys, but has been shown by genetic analysis to nest within the variation of T. barrerae''.

All species are endemic to central western Argentina, where the genus has a fragmented range. Their natural habitat is desert scrubland, dunes and salt flats, where they eat halophyte plants. They are solitary, nocturnal rodents that construct large mounds with complex burrows.

References

 
Mammals of Argentina
Endemic fauna of Argentina
Rodent genera
Taxonomy articles created by Polbot